Razmik Grigoryan may refer to:
 Razmik Grigoryan (footballer)
 Razmik Grigoryan (filmmaker)